Klaus Bargsten (31 October 1911 – 25 October 2000) was the captain and sole survivor of the sunken . He was a recipient of the Knight's Cross of the Iron Cross.

Career

Bargsten was the sole survivor.

PC-565 had transported Klaus Bargsten to Norfolk, Virginia for questioning.

Another accident described by Bargsten was the collision of two U-boats in the Baltic Sea in August or September 1942, during their tactical exercises. One boat was commanded by Oberleutnant zur See Ulrich Pietsch of the 1935 naval term. The other U-boat was commanded by an officer named Friedrichs. (Note:  U-195 has been reported as a 1200-ton U-boat. It has not been possible to identify Friedrichs with any certainty. There are three officers of this name in the German Naval List of 1940. Kapitänleutnant Adolf Friedrichs of the October 1937 naval term, has had a post in the coast artillery.)

The rudder of Pietsch’s boat became jammed, the two boats collided, and both were badly damaged. A second accident occurred to Pietsch’ boat during the working up trials. During torpedo firing exercises, while submerged, Pietsch heard propeller noises in an area in which no other ships were supposed to be present. Suddenly his boat was rammed.

Bargsten said that in Danzig he had seen the Baltic Sea freighter, Morgenrot, lying on her side after being rammed by  under command of Kapitänleutnant Wolfgang Schultze.

The prisoner recounted the story of an artillery duel in June 1942 between a destroyer and  commanded by Kapitänleutnant Peter-Erich Cremer. He said that Cremer was so severely wounded that a plane was sent to take him from the U-boat and rush him to a hospital.  (Note: This apparently happened in the Bay of Biscay, probably on a patrol subsequent to the one in which he was rammed by a tanker (June 1942) and brought his U-boat to port completely battered.)(Note 2: This story is somewhat different in the book by Peter Cremer, U-Boat Commander)

In speaking of training and tactics, Bargsten said that the training of prospective U-boat commanders through a "Konfirmandenfahrt" (guest cruise) had been abandoned. He said that captains were now drawn from the ranks of watch officers and that the Agru Front (Active Service Training Group) was considered sufficient additional training.

After Bargsten's interrogation he was held in captivity until his release in 1946. The Kriegsmarine falsely reported the entire crew of U-521 as MIA (Missing in Action).

Ranks and military decorations

Ranks
The following is a list of dates for Kptlt. Bargsten's promotions during World War II.

Decorations
The following is a list of Kptlt. Bargsten's awards and decorations.

References

Citations

Bibliography

 
 
 
 
 

1911 births
2000 deaths
People from Bad Oldesloe
People from the Province of Schleswig-Holstein
U-boat commanders (Kriegsmarine)
Recipients of the Knight's Cross of the Iron Cross
German prisoners of war in World War II held by the United States
Officials of Nazi Germany
Sole survivors
Missing in action of World War II
Military personnel from Schleswig-Holstein